Ethmia taxiacta is a moth in the family Depressariidae. It is found in Tanzania.

References

Endemic fauna of Tanzania
Moths described in 1920
taxiacta
Insects of Tanzania
Moths of Africa